Santa Clara is a city in Washington County, Utah, United States and is a part of the St. George Metropolitan Area. The population was 7,553 at the 2020 census, up from 6,003 at the 2010 census, and 4,630 at the 2000 census. The city is a western suburb of St. George.

History

In 1854, Jacob Hamblin was called by Brigham Young to serve a mission to the southern Paiute and settled at Santa Clara in the vicinity of the modern city of St. George, Utah. The town is among the oldest in the area.

The first settlers built Fort Clara or Fort Santa Clara, in the winter of 1855–1856.  In the fall of 1861, Swiss Mormon colonists arrived at the new settlement. Shortly afterward, in early 1862, they were victims of a severe flood in the Santa Clara River that destroyed the fort and most other buildings, along with irrigation dams and ditches. This event was part of the Great Flood of 1862.

Hamblin's first home in Santa Clara was destroyed in the flood. His second wife Rachael saved one of their young children from drowning, but the child soon after died from exposure. Rachael never fully recovered from exposure she suffered during the flood. Swearing to avoid such a risk again, Hamblin built a new home on a hill in Santa Clara. It is owned today by the Church of Jesus Christ of Latter-day Saints (LDS Church), which operates it as a house museum. Mormon missionaries give daily tours.

19th-century Santa Clara was largely inhabited by Mormon immigrants from Switzerland.  Among these was Daniel Bonelli, who after the 1862 flood became a pioneer colonist of St. Thomas, Nevada in the Moapa Valley. He was a farmer, salt miner, and owner of Bonelli's Ferry, at Rioville, Nevada. This was on the road between southwestern Utah and Arizona, at the confluence of the Virgin River and the Colorado River.

Geography
According to the United States Census Bureau, the city has a total area of 4.9 square miles (12.7 km2), of which 4.9 square miles (12.6 km2) is land and 0.04 square mile (0.1 km2) (0.41%) is water.

Demographics

As of the census of 2000, there were 4,630 people, 1,225 households, and 1,134 families residing in the city. The racial makeup of the city was 97.32% White, 0.15% African American, 0.30% Native American, 0.28% Asian, 0.32% Pacific Islander, 0.48% from other races, and 1.14% from two or more races. Hispanic or Latino of any race were 2.03% of the population.

There were 1,225 households, out of which 57.3% had children under the age of 18 living with them, 86.0% were married couples living together, 4.8% had a female householder with no husband present, and 7.4% were non-families. 6.4% of all households were made up of individuals, and 3.6% had someone living alone who was 65 years of age or older. The average household size was 3.78 and the average family size was 3.96.

In the city, the population was spread out, with 40.2% under the age of 18, 9.3% from 18 to 24, 23.7% from 25 to 44, 17.3% from 45 to 64, and 9.5% who were 65 years of age or older. The median age was 26 years. For every 100 females, there were 105.0 males. For every 100 females age 18 and over, there were 101.8 males.

The median income for a household in the city was $52,770, and the median income for a family was $55,000. Males had a median income of $41,350 versus $21,495 for females. The per capita income for the city was $15,957. About 2.7% of families and 3.5% of the population were below the poverty line, including 4.1% of those under age 18 and 2.8% of those age 65 or over.

Arts and culture
Santa Clara is home to several sites of importance to the LDS Church, including the Jacob Hamblin Home and the old Relief Society house, built in 1907. It has a historical cemetery.

Education 
Various  public schools service the local student population, all are within Washington County School District, with all competitive athletics and activities of the region competing in Region 9 of the UHSAA.

Elementary
Santa Clara Elementary (K-5 grades)
Arrowhead Elementary School (K-5 grades)
Lava Ridge Intermediate School (6-7 grades)

Secondary
Snow Canyon Middle School (8-9 grades in St. George, Utah)
Snow Canyon High School (10-12 grades, St. George)

Higher Education
Utah Tech University (St. George)

Notable people
 Wilford Brimley, Hollywood cowboy actor and stuntman

See also

 List of cities and towns in Utah
 Robert L. Shepherd Desert Arboretum
 Swiss Days

References

External links

 

Cities in the Mojave Desert
Cities in Utah
Cities in Washington County, Utah
Populated places established in 1854
Swiss-American culture in Utah
1854 establishments in Utah Territory